Ksenia Yevgenyevna Aleshina (born 28 January 2003) is a Russian tennis player.

She has a career-high ITF junior combined ranking of 366, achieved on 28 January 2019.

Aleshina made her WTA Tour main-draw debut at the 2019 Baltic Open in the doubles draw, partnering Kamilla Bartone.

References

External links
 

2003 births
Living people
Russian female tennis players
21st-century Russian women